The Buddhist Retreat Centre is an inclusive resort and meditation centre located near Ixopo, in Kwazulu-Natal Province, South Africa. Since opening in 1980, the BRC has provided a tranquil space amid 300 acres of rolling hills and supported the development of the Buddhist community throughout the country. The BRC hosts regular retreats and welcomes independent visitors who want to visits its facilities, without promoting one form of Buddhism over others. The BRC has received recognition for the quality of its vegetarian cuisine, which it has recorded through four popular cookbooks.

History
The BRC was founded by Louis van Loon, a Dutch-born architect and civil engineer who immigrated to South Africa in 1956. After establishing himself professionally in Durban, van Loon explored his interest in philosophy, starting with theosophy, a religion established in the late 19th century that draws on Hindu and Buddhist principles. Van Loon developed his interest further on trips to Asia, where he learned more about Buddhism.

Additional trips or pilgrimages to Buddhist communities in Sri Lanka and Tibet followed and van Loon developed his meditation practice. He became a spokesperson for the fledgling Buddhist community in Durban and lectured on the religion at the University of Durban-Westville. After a nearly fatal illness while traveling Sri Lanka, Van Loon made a commitment to establish a resort similar to the ones he had visited in Asia.

In 1970, Van Loon purchased the grounds for the BRC nearly site unseen, which at the time were derelict farmland and described by as "wild wattle wilderness". Construction began in 1976. Construction of the meditation hall was completed first, followed by accommodations. The foundation stone for the property was placed on what became a stupa, at a location indicated by Lama Anagarika Govinda. The first retreats were held in March 1980.

Antony Osler became the BRC's first resident teacher who Van Loon selected for his wide knowledge of the different schools of Buddhism Early retreat activities were very zen-focused though throughout the 1980s the range of topics explored at the BRC expanded to include workshops ranging from Classical Indian Dance, Taoism, and T'ai Chi. The role of a full-time teacher was eventually abandoned and Van Loon assumed much of the teaching.

The BRC continued to foster the development of the Buddhist community in South Africa. The BRC became known as the "kindergarten", a term coined by Van Loon, to convey its role in supporting the development of other, similar retreats around the country and the accessibility of the BRC to all forms of Buddhism and those who do not have a deep understanding of Buddhist principles.

In 1996, the BRC expanded further through a land swap with a paper company. The grounds, which were once extensively covered in wattle, were extended to the nearest road.

Facilities
The  of the BRC includes a small teaching studio which also functions as a library, a meditation hall, or gompa, and a kitchen dining room area. Its accommodations include a lodge with beds for 30 people and several chalets that were added in 2019. Outside, a centerpiece is a 5-meter-tall Buddha statue on the main lawn, designed by Van Loon and hailed as the largest Buddhist statue outside of a Buddhist country. On the grounds are also a stupa, buddha boma, or outdoor pavilion for meditation, a labyrinth, zen gardens, and a Buddhist shrine.

The BRC has significant biodiversity, including 165 species of birds. It was designated a National Heritage Site by Nelson Mandela, due to its conservation of the highly endangered blue swallow through indigenous plants. The center has been a regular nesting site for two out of only thirty known breeding pairs of blue swallows. Small mammal species, including vervet monkeys, reedbuck, and duiker, can also be found on the centre grounds.

Operations
The center operates with a rotating set of activities, with teachers on different topics as BRC retreat leaders.  Activities have included lectures on the conditions of Tibet under Chinese occupation. Recurring retreats include topics like “the radiant awareness of being”. Some retreats involve making and flying a kite, learning to sketch, or drumming. The birding weekend is noted for its popularity. Retreats are conversation free.

The BRC is maintained by a full-time staff of seven people, many of whom come for their positions from outside South Africa. Van Loon's wife, Chrisi, plays an important role in the day-to-day operations. Colin Kemery, a former retreatant who loved the facility enough to become staff, serves as groundskeeper and chi kung teacher. Consistent with Buddhist tradition, retreat instructors do not receive payment for their teaching but are funded by students' donations.

Van Loon retains ownership of the land, which will be transferred to the Buddhist Trust of South Africa after his death. The Trust's responsibility will be to ensure that Van Loon's legacy is maintained.

Food
The BRC is known for the quality of its food and some attendees come for the quality of the cooking. Van Loon emphasized the importance of good food at the BRC, as many of the retreats he had visited had such lousy food that it made visitors want to abandon vegetarianism and eat meat. The retreat center has a kitchen, run by a visiting chef and "kitchen ladies" who assist. The chef applies for the kitchen job and develops new recipes which are published in the BRC's cookbook.

The BRC has published best-selling cookbooks of its vegetarian recipes, including Quiet Food (2005), The Cake the Buddha Ate (2011) and Plentiful: The Big Book of Buddha Food (2016). Van Loon contributes reflections on his travels and studies to the books along with recipes from the visiting chef and pictures of meal preparation from the kitchen.

Woza Moya
The BRC maintains a non-profit, Woza Moya, which provides assistance to neighboring Zulu communities and disadvantaged communities throughout the province. Support has included the development of greater water access and improved food security. The organization has provided training to HIV/AIDs home-based care workers.

References

Buddhist meditation
Spiritual retreats
Buildings and structures in South Africa